West Markham or Markham Clinton is a village and civil parish  north east of Nottingham, in the Bassetlaw district, in the county of Nottinghamshire, England. In 2011 the parish had a population of 170. The parish touches Bevercotes, West Drayton, East Markham, Bothamsall, Walesby and Tuxford. The A1 previously went through the village but its now been bypassed.

Features 
There are 4 listed buildings in West Markham. West Markham has a church called All Saints' Church.

History 
The name "Markham" means 'Boundary homestead/village'. The name "Clinton" comes from the family name of the earls of Lincoln. Markham Clinton was recorded in the Domesday Book as Westmarcham. The medieval village of West Markham is now unoccupied but still has earthworks. On 1 April 1935 a part of Tuxford parish was transferred to the parish. The transferred area was 46 acres. The village has also been called Parva Markham and Little Markham.

References

External links 

 

Villages in Nottinghamshire
Civil parishes in Nottinghamshire
Bassetlaw District